Ragni (born Shamshad Begum; October 1924 – 2007), also known as Shaado, was a Pakistani actress. She worked in Urdu and Punjabi films under her stage name Ragni. She also worked in Hindi films in cinema of India. She was known for her beautiful doe like eyes and was known as Almond-eyed Beauty. Ragni is considered to be the highest-paid actress of her time in 1940s, being paid 1 lakh rupees by AR Kardar for her role in Shahjehan.

Early life
Ragini was born as Shamshad Begum in Gujranwala in 1924. Her mother died when Ragni was very young and her father Seth Diwan Parmanand took her with him to Lahore and they lived at a house on Fleming Road. In Lahore filmmaker Roshan Lal Shorey was a neighbour of Ragni and noticed her and convinced Diwan to let Ragni act in films.

Career
She started her acting career in a film which launched by Roop K Shorey in the Punjabi film Dulla Bhatti (1940) opposite MD Kanwar. The film was a major success and Ragni became a star overnight. Ragni went on to act in several Lahore based productions in Hindi and Punjabi like Sehti Murad (1941), Nishani (1942), Ravi Par (1942), Poonji (1943), Daasi (1944) and Kaise Kahun (1945).

In 1945, she left Lahore for Bombay and teamed up with A R Kardar. Later on Naik Parveen by S M Yousaf turned out to be one of her most memorable films. Ragni's role in film Naik Parveen (1946) was another successful movie that consolidated her position as a top star. Filmmaker AR Kardar offered Ragini to play Ruhi in Shahjehan (1946), It is said that Ragini was paid rupees one lakh for the film, making her the highest-paid actress of that time.

After Partition Ragni chose to move to Pakistan but has also done a couple of Indian movies which did not fare well.

In 1949 she work in her first film which was the Punjabi film, Mundri (1949) with Ilyas Kashmiri. Then she worked in films Akaili, Nazrana, Baydari, Kundan and Zanjeer. She also successfully performed a number of character roles in films such as Husn-o-Ishq, Gumnam, Ghulam, Duniya Na Maane, Mirza Jat and Aab-i-Hayat.

In the late-50s, she worked in film Anarkali with Noor Jehan and Shamim Ara which earned her fame. Later she worked in film Noukar which was a hit film. Ragni worked in a number of sixty films during her career that spanned some years.

Personal life
Ragni's married Mohammad Aslam in the early 1940s, the marriage did not last long but she had two children from her first marriage, Saira and Abid. She again got married in Pakistan in 1947 to S. Gul who produced and co-starred opposite her in Beqarar and her son Abid died from cancer some years ago in USA and her daughter Saira got married and moved to Karachi.

Illness and death
After the death of her husband Ragni did not married again and lived in Gulberg although she remained in contact with her daughter Saira. Ragni was deeply sad about the death of her son and it affected her health. Ragni was admitted at Services Hospital on Tuesday morning. She died on 27 February because she was in an extremely serious condition while she was in hospital at age 82 in 2007. She was laid to rest at Gulberg graveyard Ali-Zeb road Lahore.

Filmography

Film

References

External links
 

1924 births
20th-century Pakistani actresses
Actresses in Punjabi cinema
20th-century Indian actresses
Actresses in Hindi cinema
2007 deaths
Actresses in Urdu cinema
Punjabi people
People from Gujranwala
Actresses in Pashto cinema
21st-century Indian actresses
Indian film actresses
Punjabi women
21st-century Pakistani actresses
Pakistani film actresses